Lambda Psi Delta Sorority, Inc. is a multicultural, community service-based Greek-lettered sorority founded on March 9, 1997. Lambda Psi Delta (referred to as "LPsiD") was established by a group of women known as the Nine Black Diamonds. Lambda Psi Delta was a founding member of the National Multicultural Greek Council (NMGC) but is no longer a member.

History 
Lambda Psi Delta Sorority, Inc. was founded on March 9, 1997, at Yale University by nine women who were formerly part of a Latina sorority. They decided to leave their former sorority and create an organization whose primary goal was the upliftment and empowerment of women and their communities. They formed Lambda Psi Delta, a multi-ethnic, service-based organization, for women by women and about women. Its motto is "sovereignty to the community."

The founders are referred to as the Nine Black Diamonds. They are: Ericka Ramos Carrasquillo, Irma Beatriz Cordero, Margarita Martis Navarro, Isabel Veguilla, Paula Arputhasamy Ladd, Laura Elaine Gilbert, Karina Tejeda, Marina Lori Franzoni, and Denise J. Pipersburgh.

The sorority incorporated in 1998 in Connecticut. Lambda Psi Delta now has undergraduate chapters in Florida, New Jersey, Connecticut, Texas and Louisiana. It also has two graduate chapters as well as the Connecticut Graduate Association.Although the sorority works primarily in minority communities, its members are from a variety of backgrounds including African, Afro-American, Anglo-American, Belizean, Chilean, Chinese, Colombian, Costa Rican, Dominican, East Indian, El Salvadoran, Ecuadorian, Filipino, Guatemalan, Greek, Haitian, Hungarian, Italian, Iranian, Irish, Jamaican, Korean, Mexican, Pakistani, Palestinian, Polish, Puerto Rican, Russian, Somalian, Scottish, West Indian, Transylvanian, and Vietnamese.

The LILies is the official interest group of Lambda Psi Delta Sorority, Inc. The acronym LILies stands for Ladies Interested in Lambda Psi Delta. The purpose of the LILies group is threefold. It serves to teach interested ladies more about Lambda Psi Delta, encourage service and academic excellence, and to foster a relationship amongst other interested ladies nationwide.

Service 
One of the sorority’s governing principles is a commitment to empowering and uplifting the larger community, as well as political involvement to initiate and promote political change. The sorority's program includes public service and political service. Some of its original programs include the LPsiD College Resource Center, Unity Day, and the sorority’s proprietary educational campaigns which address current societal concerns. Its current focus initiatives include multiple sclerosis research and the STEP UP–SPEAK OUT! Bullying Awareness and Prevention Campaign which is a partnership initiative with Omega Phi Chi sorority.

Chapters 
Active chapters are indicated in bold. Inactive chapters are indicated in italic. Graduate chapters are indicated with the prefix Gamma.

Notes

See also 

 Cultural interest fraternities and sororities

References 

Former members of National Multicultural Greek Council
Student societies in the United States
Student organizations established in 1997
1997 establishments in Connecticut